These Days is a 2016 Italian drama film directed by Giuseppe Piccioni. It was selected to compete for the Golden Lion at the 73rd Venice International Film Festival.

Cast
Laura Adriani as Angela
Margherita Buy as Adria
Giulio Corso as Valerio
Marta Gastini as Caterina
Caterina Le Caselle as Caterina
Maria Roveran as Liliana
Filippo Timi as Professor Mariani
Sergio Rubini as Angela's father

Reception
David Rooney of The Hollywood Reporter praised the role by Margherita Buy, saying that "[the film] makes you long for the clear-eyed introspection of the Nico song". Jay Weissberg of Variety wrote: "Four young women on the brink of adulthood make a road trip to Belgrade in this cliché-riddled piece of banality".

References

External links

2016 drama films
Italian drama films
Films directed by Giuseppe Piccioni
2010s Italian-language films
2010s Italian films